"If You Should Go" is a song by Dutch disc jockey and record producer Armin van Buuren. It features vocals and lyrics from Dutch singer Susana. The song was released in the Netherlands by Armind on 21 April 2008 as the only single from van Buuren's compilation Universal Religion Chapter 3 and from Susana's album Closer. The song is included as a bonus track on the iTunes version of van Buuren's third studio album Imagine. It is the second collaboration between van Buuren and Susana after their hit "Shivers" in 2005.

Background 
According to the website Trance History, following an "aggressive sound of uplifting trance", the song "anticipated the release of the album Imagine".

Music video 
A music video to accompany the release of "If You Should Go" was first released onto YouTube on 1 March 2010.

Track listing 
 Netherlands – Armind – Digital download long version 
 "If You Should Go" (Original Mix) – 7:46
 "If You Should Go" (Aly & Fila Remix) – 9:06
 "If You Should Go" (Aly & Fila Dub Mix) – 9:06
 "If You Should Go" (Inpetto vs. Duderstadt Remix) - 7:54
 "If You Should Go" (Inpetto vs. Duderstadt Instrumental Mix) - 7:54
 "If You Should Go" (John O'Callaghan Remix) – 7:59
 "If You Should Go" (John O'Callaghan Dub Mix) – 7:59
 "If You Should Go" (John O'Callaghan Instrumental Mix) – 7:59
 "If You Should Go" (Inpetto vs. Duderstadt Dub Mix) - 7:54

 Netherlands – Armind – Digital download short version 
 "If You Should Go" (Original Mix) – 7:46
 "If You Should Go" (Aly & Fila Remix) – 9:06
 "If You Should Go" (Inpetto vs. Duderstadt Remix) - 7:54
 "If You Should Go" (John O'Callaghan Vocal Mix) – 7:59

 Netherlands – Armada – CD 
 "If You Should Go" (Radio Edit) – 3:30
 "If You Should Go" (Original Mix) – 7:46

 United States – Ultra – Inpetto vs. Duderstadt Dub Mix - digital download '''
 "If You Should Go" (Inpetto vs. Duderstadt Dub Mix) - 7:54

Charts

References 

2008 singles
2008 songs
Armin van Buuren songs
Songs written by Armin van Buuren
Armada Music singles